With Macau's small population (about 500,000) and market, only a few media options are available for the local people. Because radio signals, newspapers and magazines from Hong Kong are available in Macau, the local media are always a minority group in terms of sales and number of viewers.

Newspapers
There are eighteen newspapers (twelve in Chinese, four in Portuguese and two in English). O Mun Yat Po or Macau Daily News) is reportedly owned by the Communist Party of China and has the largest circulation (4,000). Additionally, Chinese-language newspapers from Hong Kong are popular.

Macau has eight Chinese-language, three Portuguese-language and two English-language dailies. The Macau Daily Times is Macau's only English-language newspaper edited seven days a week. Macau Post Daily is published from Monday to Friday. It is owned by a local publishing company, Everbright Co. Ltd., which is locally owned.

Radio
There are 250,000 radios; two twenty-hour FM radio stations, one Portuguese, one Chinese; and four AM stations. Hong Kong radio stations also are popular in Macau.
 Radio broadcast stations: AM 1, FM 2, shortwave 0 (2005)
 Radios: 160,000 (1997)

Television

There are 70,300 television sets (1997 estimate); two television channels: one Portuguese and one Chinese. Hong Kong television networks TVB and ViuTV can be received and are widely watched by Macau residents.
 Television broadcast stations: 3 (2006)
 Televisions: 49,000 (1997)

Macau also owns its very own television station called TDM. It has 16 digital television channels (6 channels are own channel, 1 channel for transmitting own radio, 9 channels are transmitting television channels from mainland China).

Telephone

The number of telephone lines has been increasing since the mid-1990s. In 1997 there were 222,456 telephones; by 1999, 300,066 lines were in use. In 1999 there were 686 telephone lines per 1,000 people. Cellular-telephone-use statistics were not available. International access is via Hong Kong and Mainland China and via Intelsat (Indian Ocean).  Alcatel-Lucent was granted a contract in February 2007 to collocate a CDMA2000 1xEV-DO (Revision A) high-speed wireless network in Macau for China Unicom. Following the completion of the upgrades in related software and hardware, China Unicom will be equipped with the facilities needed to provide high-speed mobile data services for users in Macau, including broadcasting and video telephony.
 Telephone main lines in use: 175,592 (July 2006)
 Mobile cellular telephones: 325,016 (July 2006)

Telephone system: fairly modern communication facilities maintained for domestic and international services
 domestic: N/A
 international: HF radiotelephone communication facility; access to international communications carriers provided via Hong Kong and Mainland China; satellite earth station - 1 Intelsat (Indian Ocean)
 Users: 88,653 (2005)

Mobile phone operators

Decommissioning of GSM
GSM mobile phone networks for consumers in Macau were set to be decommissioned in July 2012. Networks will only be left in place for visitors to roam onto. The planned shutdown will make Macau be the first region in the world to phase out networks using the GSM standard, but it was postponed until 2019.

Internet

Internet Service Providers (ISPs): CTM (Companhia de Telecomunicações de Macau S.A.R.L.)

Country code (Top level domain): .mo

Broadband Internet access
The Macao Telecommunications Company (CTM) in 2000 launched the first broadband Internet access in the territory, on a network built by Cisco Systems.

MTel Telecommunications also provides fixed line services as well as broadband and is CTM's main competitor, though much smaller market share.

See also
 Media of Macau
 Communications in Hong Kong
 Communications in China
 List of Chinese-language television channels
 CTM (Macau)

References and notes

External links
 CIA - The World Factbook - Macau

 
Macau
Macau